Anisota consularis, the Florida oakworm moth or consular oakworm moth, is a moth in the family Saturniidae. The species was first described by Harrison Gray Dyar Jr. in 1896. It is found in North America.

The MONA or Hodges number for Anisota consularis is 7718.

References

Further reading

External links

 

Ceratocampinae
Articles created by Qbugbot
Moths described in 1896